Portland Ice Arena may refer to:

 Portland Ice Arena (Maine)
 Portland Ice Arena (Oregon)